San Sebastiano is a small, neo-gothic-style, Roman Catholic church located on Viale dei Cipressi in Bolgheri, a village in the municipality of Castagneto Carducci, province of Livorno, Tuscany, Italy.

History
This brick church was erected in the late 19th century, and has a portal with fragments of a mural depicting Ecce Homo. The mouldings and the cross atop the tympanum are stone. Above the entrance is the crest of the Della Gherardesca family; the church contains family tombs. The interior apse is frescoed with a Madonna and child. The remainder of the church has floral and geometric decorations.

References

19th-century Roman Catholic church buildings in Italy
Gothic Revival church buildings in Italy
Churches in the province of Livorno